Silvano Carroli (22 February 1939 – 4 April 2020) was an Italian baritone.

Biography 
Carroli was born in Venice. Orphaned as a result of his father's death at only six years of age, he began to attend the oratory of the Basilica of San Marco, but family needs prevented him from continuing the study of music. After getting engaged to his future wife, he decided to pursue a career as an opera singer.

He studied with the teacher Marcello Del Monaco and perfected later with Mario Del Monaco. Later he was admitted to the training school of the La Fenice Theater in Venice, under the guidance of the masters Mario Labroca, Francesco Siciliani and Floris Ammannati, making his debut in 1963 as Marcello in Giacomo Puccini's La bohème, alongside Mirella Freni and Giacomo Aragall, the opera was directed by Franco Zeffirelli.

Already in 1966 he began to face the most demanding roles in the repertoire. From Verdi he played Ezio in Attila, Jago in Othello, Renato in Un ballo in maschera, Don Carlo in La Forza del Destino, Monforte in I vespri siciliani, Giorgio Germont in La traviata, Simon Boccanegra, Macbeth, Nebuchadnezzar in Nabucco, Roger in Jérusalem and Pagano in I Lombardi at the first crusade, Amonasro in Aida.

Also by other composers, he played Jack Rance in La fanciulla del West, Michele in Il tabarro, Scarpia in Tosca, Alfio in Cavalleria rusticana, Barnaba in La Gioconda, Tonio in Pagliacci, Gianciotto in Francesca da Rimini, Enrico in Lucia di Lammermoor, Il Duca D 'Alba and the High Priest of Samson et Dalila.

He sang with many illustrious colleagues, including Boris Christoff, Mario Del Monaco, Magda Olivero, Carlo Bergonzi, Cesare Siepi, Raina Kabaivanska, Ghena Dimitrova, Montserrat Caballé, Maria Dragoni, Plácido Domingo, Luciano Pavarotti, José Carreras, Nicolai Ghiaurov, and was under the guidance of famous directors, such as James Levine, Carlos Kleiber, Zubin Mehta, Peter Maag, Wolfgang Sawallisch, Franco Capuana, Francesco Molinari Pradelli, Giuseppe Sinopoli, Bruno Bartoletti and Claudio Abbado.

in August 2007 at the Arena di Verona he successfully added to the baritone interpretations to that as the bass in the role of Verdi of Zaccaria (there are some live recordings where he sings also in the tenor register).

in 2008 he was a protagonist in two productions of the "Fanciulla del West": in Rome and at the Covent Garden (with Josè Cura and the direction of Antonio Pappano). In 2009 he was Scarpia in Tel Aviv, under Daniel Oren's wand. In the same year he was then Amonasro in Verona.

While continuing his artistic activity, Carroli also dedicated himself for years to teaching and held the chair of singing at the school for tenors of the Del Monaco Foundation. He died in Lucca, aged 81.

Repertoire 

 Georges Bizet
 Carmen (Escamillo)
 Alfredo Catalani
 La Wally (Gellner)
 Gaetano Donizetti
 Lucia di Lammermoor (Lord Enrico Asthon)
 Il Duca d'Alba (Duca d'Alba)
 Umberto Giordano
 Andrea Chénier (Carlo Gérard)
 Charles Gounod
 Faust (Mephistopheles)
 Ruggero Leoncavallo
 Pagliacci (Prologo, Tonio)
 Pietro Mascagni
 Cavalleria rusticana (Compar Alfio)
 Isabeau (Re Raimondo)
 Giacomo Meyerbeer
 L'Africana (Nelusko)
 Wolfgang Amadeus Mozart
 Don Giovanni (Don Giovanni)
 Amilcare Ponchielli
 La Gioconda (Barnaba)
 Giacomo Puccini
 La bohème (Marcello)
 Tosca (Il barone Scarpia)
 Madama Butterfly (Sharpless)
 La fanciulla del West (Jack Rance)
 Il tabarro (Michele)
 Gianni Schicchi (Gianni Schicchi)
 Gioachino Rossini
 Moïse et Pharaon (Faraone)
 Camille Saint-Saëns
 Samson et Dalila (Il sommo sacerdote di Dagone)
 Giuseppe Verdi
 Nabucco (Nabucodonosor, Zaccaria)
 I Lombardi alla prima crociata (Pagano)
 Attila (Ezio)
 Macbeth (Macbeth)
 Jérusalem (Roger)
 Il corsaro (Seid)
 Rigoletto (Rigoletto)
 Il trovatore (Il Conte di Luna)
 La traviata (Giorgio Germont)
 I vespri siciliani (Guido di Monforte)
 Simon Boccanegra (Simon Boccanegra)
 Un ballo in maschera (Renato)
 La forza del destino (Don Carlo di Vargas)
 Aida (Amonasro)
 Otello (Jago)
 Richard Wagner
 Lohengrin (Federico di Telramondo)
 Riccardo Zandonai
 Francesca da Rimini (Gianciotto)

Disks 
Audio

 Catalani - La Wally - Olivero, Carroli, Zambon - Live 1972
 Donizetti - Lucia di Lammermoor - Mazzola, Morino, Carroli - Live Napoli 1989
 Mascagni - Cavalleria Rusticana - Domingo, Carroli - Arena di Verona - Live 1977
 Mascagni - Cavalleria Rusticana - Lamberti, Jones, Carroli - Live 1987 Munich
 Mascagni - Cossotto, Martinucci, Carroli Santi Verona 1987
 Mascagni - Carroli, Berini, Vanzo Suzan Marseille 1976
 Mascagni - Casolla, Johansson, Carroli Gavazzeni Firenze 1991
 Puccini - La Fanciulla del West - Dimitrova, Bonisolli, Carroli Sinopoli Berlin 1982
 Puccini - La Fanciulla del West - Dessì, Armiliato, Carroli - Live Roma 2008
 Puccini - La Fanciulla del West - Carroli Westbroek Cura Pappano London 2009
 Puccini - La Fanciulla del West - Carroli MJ Johnson Frusoni Latham Koenig Caracalla 1988
 Puccini - La Fanciulla del West - Carroli S Larson, Popov Arena Verona 1986
 Puccini - Tosca - Caballé, Todisco, Carroli - Live 1983
 Puccini - Tosca - Miricioiu, G. Lamberti, Carroli - Alexander Rahbari - Live Studio Naxos
 Puccini - Tosca - Carroli, Casolla Todisco Oren Verona 1989
 Puccini - Tosca - Carroli, He, A. Richards Oren Verona 2006
 Puccini - Tosca - Carroli, Cedolins, Martinucci Lynn-Wilson Verona
 Verdi - Aida - Giacomini, Carroli - Live Caracalla Roma
 Verdi - Aida - Giuliacci, Carroli - Oren - Live Roma 2009
 Verdi - Aida - Borin, Hui He, Carroli - Oren - Live Arena di Verona 2009
 Verdi - Aida - Nizza, Cornetti, Giuliacci, Spotti Oren Verona 2006
 Verdi - La forza del Destino - Caballé, Carroli - Live 1982
 Verdi - Macbeth - Carroli, Martinucci - Live
 Verdi - Otello - Domingo, Tomowa-Sintow, Carroli - Kleiber - Live Tokio 1981
 Verdi - Un ballo in maschera - Pavarotti, Caballé, Carroli - live 1982 San Francisco
 Verdi - Un ballo in maschera - Chiara, Carroli, Gilmore, Ferrarini, Lima Kuhn Verona 1984
 Verdi - Attila - Chiara, Giaiotti, Carroli, Malagnini Santi Verona 1986
 Verdi - Attila - Zampieri, Carroli, Ghiuselev, Beccaria Masini Napoli 1987
 Verdi - Attila - Cruz-Romo, Carroli, Ghiaurov, Luchetti Bartoletti Chicago 1981
 Meyerbeer - L'Africaine - Carroli, Bumbry Domingo Atherton London 1981
 Meyerbeer - L'Africaine - Carroli, Bumbry Bonisolli Atherton London 1981
 Giordano - Andrea Chenier - Carroli, Ligabue Vickers Rescigno Dallas 1973
 Donizetti - Il Duca D'Alba - Carroli, Krilovici Garaventa De Fabritiis Bruxelles 1979
 Ponchielli - Gioconda - Carroli Casolla Cossotto Pecile Beccaria Verducci Renzetti Verona 1988
 Ponchielli - Gioconda - Carroli Casolla V.Cortez Beccaria Gioaiotti Renzetti Verona 1988
 Verdi - Il Trovatore - Carroli S.Dunn Zajick Bonisolli Skinner Meltzer San Francisco 1986
 Verdi - Nabucco - Carroli Dimitrova Nesterenko Ysas Ruiz Gandolfi Barcelona 1984
 Verdi - Nabucco - Carroli Roark-Strummer, Nesterenko Jjori Todisco Oren Verona 1988
 Verdi - Nabucco - Carroli Roark Strummer Nesterenko Schiatti Tieppo Oren Verona 1988
 Verdi - Nabucco - Carroli Vejzovic Jankovic Storojev Todisco Gandolfi Caracalla 1985
 Verdi - Nabucco - Carroli Gulegina Surguladse Nucci (Carroli canta il ruolo di Zaccaria) Borin Oren Verona 2008
 Verdi - Nabucco - Carroli Roark-Strummer Nesterenko Patti Tieppo Tolomelli Verona 1988
 Rossini - Mosè - Carroli Casapietra Casoni Limarilli Siepi Gavazzeni Firenze 1974
 Saint-Saëns - Sansone e Dalila - Carroli Cossotto Vinco Maag Verona 1974(in Italiano)
 Saint-Saëns - Sansone e Dalila - Carroli Baltsa Domingo C.Davis London 1995
 Mascagni - Isabeau - Carroli Pobbe Zannini Ferraro Mazzini Rapallo Napoli 1972
 Verdi - Rigoletto - Carroli Ferrarini Meneghelli Sempere Luperi Santi Verona 1988
 Verdi - Rigoletto - Carroli Ferrarini Schiatti Sempere Luperi Santi Verona 1988
 Verdi - Jerusalem - Carroli Gasdia Luchetti Renzetti Paris 1984
 Wagner - Lohengrin - Carroli Ricciarelli Berini Cava Zecchillo Bartoletti Venezia 1973 (In Italiano)
 Leoncavallo - Pagliacci - Carroli Kabaivanska Vickers L.Carlson Rescigno Dallas 1972
 Verdi - Forza del Destino - Carroli Ross, Vighi, Limarilli, Vinco,M.Basiola jr Rossi Venezia 1966
 Verdi - Otello - Carroli Domingo M.Price C.Kleiber London 1981
 Verdi - Otello - Carroli Ricciarelli, Cossutta Guadagno Cyprus 1996
 Verdi - Otello - Carroli Tomowa-Sintow, Domingo C.Kleiber La Scala a Tokio 1980
 Album - The very best of Puccini - Gauci, Carroli, Orgonasova, G.Lamberti, Miricioiu - CD Naxos

DVD

 Bizet - Carmen - Obraztsova, Ferrarini, Carreras Delacote Barcelona 1983
 Verdi - Attila - Chiara, Giaiotti, Luchetti Santi Verona 1986
 Verdi - Attila - Chiara, Ghiuselev, Luchetti Santi Torino 1983
 Puccini - Gianni Schicchi - Carroli - Teatro Filarmonico Verona
 Puccini - Il Tabarro - Domingo, Carroli - Madrid Live 1982
 Puccini - La Fanciulla del West - Dimitrova, Domingo - Live
 Puccini - La Fanciulla del West - Neblett, Domingo, Carroli - Santi - Royal Opera House di Londra
 Verdi - Aida - Giacomini, Carroli - Arena di Verona
 Verdi - Aida - Sweet, Zajick, Scuderi, Giaiotti Steinberg Verona 1990
 Verdi - Aida - Chiara, Baglioni, Cecchele, Vinco Renzetti Luxor 1987
 Verdi - Attila - Nesterenko, Chiara, Carroli, Luchetti - Santi - Arena di Verona 1985
 Verdi - I Lombardi alla Prima Crociata - Carreras, Dimitrova, Carroli - Gavazzeni - Teatro la Scala
 Verdi - Otello - Carroli Lorengar Domingo Navarro Madrid 1985
 Verdi - Rigoletto - Carroli - Arena di Verona 1991
 Gounod - Faust - Carroli, Aragall, Dessì, Sardinero - Lombard - Teatro Comunale Bologna 1985
 Zandonai - Francesca da Rimini - Cura, Carroli, Kabaivanska - Teatro Massimo di Palermo 1995
 Zandonai - Francesca da Rimini - Nizza, Michailov, Carroli - Teatro dell'Opera di Roma 2003
 Verdi - Nabucco - Carroli Roark-Strummer Nesterenko Patti Tieppo Tolomelli Verona 1988
 Verdi - Jerusalem - Carroli Gasdia Luchetti Renzetti Paris 1984
 Verdi - Forza del Destino - Carroli Caballe, Mattiucci, Mauro, Plishka, Bacquier Gomez-Martinez Orange 1982
 Verdi - Otello - Carroli Tomowa-Sintow, Domingo C.Kleiber La Scala a Tokio 1980

References

External links 
 

2020 deaths
1939 births
Italian operatic baritones
Musicians from Venice
20th-century Italian male opera singers
21st-century Italian male  opera singers